Brighton Grammar School is an independent Anglican day school for boys, located in Brighton, a south-eastern suburb of Melbourne, Victoria, Australia.

Founded in 1882 by George Henry Crowther, Brighton Grammar has a non-selective enrolment policy and currently caters for over 1,400 students from the Early Learning Centre (ELC) to Year 12. The majority of students are drawn from the City of Bayside and surrounding suburbs of Brighton, East Brighton, Elsternwick, Hampton, Sandringham, Highett, Beaumaris and Black Rock.

The school is affiliated with a number of associations including the Headmasters' and Headmistresses' Conference, the Junior School Heads Association of Australia (JSHAA), the Association of Heads of Independent Schools of Australia (AHISA), the Australian Anglican Schools Network, and the Associated Public Schools of Victoria (APS).

History

Brighton Grammar School was founded on 14 February 1882, with eight male students. By 1890, 160 boys were in attendance. During the depression of the 1890s, students numbers declined rapidly. 

Brighton Grammar School’s first site was Temperly Lodge, located on Outer Crescent, north of Allee St. where the school’s Urwin Centre for Learning currently stands. The School’s second site, Pendennis on New St., was opened in 1886 when the school boasted near 160 pupils. In 1905, the Headmaster and founder purchased Rosstrevor, a large estate south of Allee St and its surrounding swampland. This land is now known as the Crowther Oval, sitting at the centre of the school. The oval was constructed by the help of “Old Boy engineers” who called upon “4000 loads of filling” to produce the oval.

The school founder, George Henry Crowther was  headmaster until his death in 1918. His son, Lieutenant Colonel Harry Arnold A. Crowther, subsequently assumed the role. Crowther retired in 1924, when Herbert E. Dixon took over.

Under Dixon, the school came near to bankruptcy, however was saved by incorporation under the auspices of the Church of England. In February of 1927, the Governor-General Lord Stonehaven opened the present site of Brighton Grammar’s Quadrangle.  Dixon continued in expanding the school until his retirement in 1938. 

Geoffrey G. Green was headmaster until sickness resulted in his resignation in 1942. His successor was Reverend Phillip St. John Wilson.

In 1958, Brighton Grammar joined the Associated Public Schools of Victoria (APS), and soon after purchased grounds on the former Brighton Gas Company site, where "Wilson House", now the Junior School, was to be built to accommodate the growing student numbers. Under Wilson, the school’s facilities grew, with the Tower Wing of the Quadrangle expanded, the first Annandale Pavilion constructed, and the Memorial Hall (where BGS’ library now stands) constructed. 

With Wilson as Headmaster, enrolment continued to grow at a high rate. The number of boys reached 800 during the 1960s.

From 1967 to 1995, Robert Lancelot Rofe was headmaster. Rofe oversaw a large change in the school, with BGS’ facilities drastically expanded to accommodate an increasing number of students. Physical changes included the construction of the swimming pool at Wilson House, the Clive Crosby building (now the B-Hive) the Zachariah Wing, Baddiley Building at Wilson House and the Robert Sanderson Centenary Hall. In addition to these, the R. L. Rofe Creative Arts Centre accommodating music, woodwork, art and design was constructed and named in the Headmaster’s honour. 

Michael Spencer Urwin was appointed headmaster at the beginning of 1996. He had previously held the position of deputy headmaster at Brisbane Grammar School, and began his term by implementing a curriculum review, a pastoral care system, and a program of modernisation. This also included community education opportunities in out of school hours in order to make the school more inclusive and less parochial. A new senior school library and resource centre, and specialist classroom facilities were built to upgrade facilities in the senior school as well as the middle school later on. 

Urwin saw the purchase of the Girrawheen site north of Allee Street (now the Urwin Centre for Learning), the construction of the Atrium and Senior Library, and the resurfacing of the H.V. Mitchell and Junior ovals to synthetic. In 2011, under Urwin still, the Peter Toms Early Learning Centre was established, whilst construction began on the new middle school.

Enrolment sat at unprecedented level at Urwin’s departure from Brighton Grammar, with 1262 boys on the roll at the period when Ross P. Featherston was appointed Headmaster of Brighton Grammar School. 

So far, under Featherston, the school has undergone redevelopment, with improvements to the G.B. Robertson Hall at Wilson House, renovation of the Crosby Building into the B-Hive, complete reconstruction of the Annandale Pavilion, internal renovations to the Argyle Building, the Tower and Hancock Wings and the Junior School, as well as ambitious projects such as the Urwin Centre for Learning (opened 2014) and the upcoming Centre for Science, Creativity and Entrepreneurship turning soil in late 2022.

In 2022, BGS celebrated its 140th anniversary. The program BGS2032 was created by the school to mark where BGS would be at its 150th anniversary.

Affiliations
Brighton Grammar School has a close sister school relationship with Firbank Girls' Grammar School, an independent Anglican school for girls. Students of the two schools participate in a range of co-educational activities together.  The school also maintains a close relationship with St Andrew's Anglican Church, Brighton.

In 2003, the Australian Government created the “Lighthouse Schools” program wherein 226 boys’ schools across Australia were selected as guiding institutions given data that boys were “significantly underperforming in key educational areas.” Brighton Grammar School received a $5,000 grant under the program to become a pivotal boys’ school.

Crowther Centre for Learning and Innovation
The Crowther Centre for Learning and Innovation is an organisation run under the auspices of Brighton Grammar School to provide support services for the educational community. 
The Crowther Centre is part think-tank and research arm overseeing the collection and analysis of data to provide improved and informed decision-making processes. The Head of the Crowther Centre is Dr Ray Swann.

House system
Brighton Grammar School has six houses: Armstrong (white), Crowther (yellow), Dixon (blue), Hancock (green), Rofe (purple) and School (red). In 1924 the original houses were Armstrong, Crowther, Dixon, Melville and School (for boarders).

Curriculum 
Brighton Grammar offers its senior students the Victorian Certificate of Education (VCE).

Extracurricular activities

Sport 
Brighton Grammar is a member of the Associated Public Schools of Victoria (APS), and partakes in various sporting competitions against its other members. Students from year 7-12 participate in sports on Saturday with training during the week. These sports include rowing, sailing, basketball, AFL, rugby, touch rugby, diving, cricket, soccer, hockey and swimming.

APS Premierships 
Brighton Grammar has won the following APS premierships:

 Badminton - 2002
 Cricket (6) - 1977, 1980, 1983, 1984, 2000, 2005
 Cross Country (2) - 1996, 1997
 Football (6) - 1975, 1992, 2014, 2015, 2016, 2022
 Hockey - 1998
 Rowing (2) - 1983, 2021
 Soccer (4) - 1999, 2003, 2004, 2013
 Tennis (2) - 2000, 2001

STEM

Formula 1 in Schools

Brighton Grammar participates in the Formula 1 in Schools challenge annually. They have advanced to the National Final for this competition five times, with the following teams:

2017 - Blue Tongue Racing (Development Class)
2020 - Tasman 6 (the first F1 in Schools partner team between Australia and New Zealand) (Professional Class)
2020(21) - Constellation Racing (Professional Class)
2021(22) - Constellation (Professional Class, as with 2020(21))
2021(22) - Livewire (Development Class)
2022(23) - Phantom Racing (Professional Class)
2022(23 - Lunar Racing (Development Class)

In 2022, Brighton Grammar School’s F1 in Schools teams, Constellation and LiveWire both advanced to the 2023 Aramco F1 in Schools World Finals. This was the first occasion within Australia that one school sent two category class teams to the World Finals. Thus, Brighton Grammar School has advanced to the World Final for this competition twice, with the following teams:

2022(23) - Constellation
2022(23) - Livewire / Aero Racing (Modbury High School Collaboration)

Brighton Grammar School runs the  program in Year 8, a competition where students are encouraged to design and pitch new products to the cohort. There are finalists and a winner chosen from the competitors, with the most recent being:

2022 - Nate W - Refurbished Cricket Bats
2021 - Ben R - Solar Sun Tracker
2020 - James T - Vision Impaired Rubik's Cube
2019 - Jenson G - Digest'a Bowls 
2018 - Jordan S - Mindfulness Pod

Music
Brighton Grammar has a rich music program, with several orchestras, ensembles, and choirs, including:

Senior Symphony Orchestra
Senior Big Band
Corelli String Orchestra
Senior Choir
Senior Guitar Orchestra
Cello Choir
Flute Ensemble
Meliora Voices Choir (Years 7 - 8)
Ten Tonners
(List incomplete)

Notable alumni

Alumni of Brighton Grammar School are commonly referred to as Old Boys or Old Grammarians and may elect to join the schools' alumni association, the Old Brighton Grammarians' Society (OBGS). Some notable Old Brighton Grammarians include:

Architecture, engineering and technology

 John Leopold Denman- member of dynasty of architects
John Robertson Duigan and Reginald Duigan - Australian pioneer aviators who built and flew the first Australian-made aircraft.
Sir Lionel Hooke – Pioneer in radio; Wireless operator in Ernest Shackleton's Imperial Antarctic Expedition; Engineer

Business

 Doug Warbrick - co-founder of Rip Curl.
Andrew Bassat - co-founder of SEEK. 
Paul Bassat - co-founder of SEEK.

Entertainment, media and the arts

 Neil Douglas MBE – Environmental artist; Conservationist; Author
Charlie Pickering – Australian comedian, television and radio presenter, author and producer, and host of The Weekly with Charlie Pickering

Medical

Professor Ian Meredith AM – Interventional Cardiologist, Director of MonashHeart, Professor of Cardiology at Monash University
 Brad McKay – Doctor, author and television personality
 Lieutenant Colonel James Joachim Nicholas M.B.B.S., M.D. - VFL footballer, killed in action in World War I.

Military

William Grant CMG, DSO and Bar, VD – Soldier and commander of the 4th Light Horse Brigade at the Battle of Beersheba
Lt. Col C. T. C. de Crespigny,

Politics, public service and the law

Sir Stanley Argyle KBE – Former Premier of Victoria; Member (Nationalist) for the seat of Toorak
Barry Robert Dove – Judge of the County Court of Victoria
The Honourable Justice Kim Hargrave – Justice of the Supreme Court of Victoria Court of Appeal
Peter Reith – Australian politician (Liberal); Minister Howard Government 1996–2003; Member for the seat of Flinders
Michael Rozenes QC – Chief judge of the County Court of Victoria
Raymond Walter Tovell – Member of the Victorian Legislative Assembly (Liberal) for Brighton
 Charles Wheeler – Master of the Supreme Court of Victoria

Religion

John Charles McIntyre – Former Anglican Bishop of the Diocese of Gippsland, Victoria; Recipient of the Centenary Medal 2003 (also attended Fort Street High School)

Sport

Dylan Alcott – Paralympian
Will Ashcroft-AFL player
Travis Brooks – Olympic hockey player
Louis Butler (footballer) – AFL Footballer
Ben Canham - Australian representative rower
Warwick Capper – AFL footballer
Josh Clayton – AFL footballer
Andrew Cooper – Olympic rower
Chris Dawes – AFL footballer
Jayden Hunt – AFL footballer
Ben Jacobs AFL footballer
Josh Kelly- AFL footballer
Andrew Lauterstein – Olympic swimmer
Matthew Lloyd – Olympic cyclist
Mat McBriar – American football player
William C. McClelland – doctor, VFL footballer and Victorian Football League President
Andrew McGrath AFL footballer
Gary Minihan – Olympian, Commonwealth Medal Winner, Australian Record Holder (since 1984)
Christian Salem – AFL footballer
Albert Thurgood – VFL footballer
Will Thursfield – AFL footballer
Matthew Warnock – AFL footballer
Robert Warnock – AFL footballer
Jack Watts – AFL footballer, No.1 Draft pick 2008
David Wittey – AFL footballer
Nathan Murphy – AFL footballer
Will Pucovski- cricketer
 Tommy Smith, international racing driver
 Archie Perkins, AFL player
 Cameron Mackenzie

See also
 List of schools in Victoria

References

External links

 
 Crowther Centre for Learning and Innovation
 Understanding Boys
 Firbank Grammar School
 Old Brighton Grammarians
 George Henry Crowther (1854-1918) Gravesite at the Brighton General Cemetery (Vic)

Associated Public Schools of Victoria
Member schools of the Headmasters' and Headmistresses' Conference
Boys' schools in Victoria (Australia)
Educational institutions established in 1882
Junior School Heads Association of Australia Member Schools
Anglican secondary schools in Melbourne
1882 establishments in Australia
Buildings and structures in the City of Bayside